Benjamin Hutchison Humble MBE (1903–1977) was a Scottish writer and climber who was responsible for the creation of Scottish Mountain Rescue teams as we know them today. He was also a keen photographer and film maker.  During the World War II he produced several educational films in order to support the war effort.

Humble was born in Dumbarton in 1903, one of the sons of the manager of Dennystown Forge. Despite his total deafness he became a dentist, later making advances in forensic dentistry.

A biography of his life, The Voice of the Hills: The Story of Ben Humble  was written by his nephew Roy Humble in 1995.

Works

Books
 Arrochar and District: A Complete Guide (1930) 
 Tramping in Skye (1933)
 The Songs of Skye (1934)
 Wayfaring Around Scotland (1936) 
 Songs For Climbers (1938), a collection of climbing songs put together by Humble and his publisher W.M.McLellan
 Rock Climbs on the Cobbler (1940), written with the assistance of J.B.Nimlin and G.C.Williams
 On Scottish Hills (1946) 
 The Cuillin of Skye (1952)
 Rock Climbs at Arrochar (1954), written with the assistance of J.B.Nimlin.

Films
 A Bomb Fell (1941)
 A Cragsman's Day (1946)
 Holidays in Arrochar (1949)

Notes

References

Scottish mountain climbers
Scottish dentists
1977 deaths
1903 births
Scottish film producers
People from Dumbarton
Scottish non-fiction writers
20th-century dentists
20th-century Scottish businesspeople